Collagen is the main structural protein in the extracellular matrix found in the body's various connective tissues. As the main component of connective tissue, it is the most abundant protein in mammals, making up from 25% to 35% of the whole-body protein content. Collagen consists of amino acids bound together to form a triple helix of elongated fibril known as a collagen helix. It is mostly found in connective tissue such as cartilage, bones, tendons, ligaments, and skin.

Depending upon the degree of mineralization, collagen tissues may be rigid (bone) or compliant (tendon) or have a gradient from rigid to compliant (cartilage). Collagen is also abundant in corneas, blood vessels, the gut, intervertebral discs, and the dentin in teeth. In muscle tissue, it serves as a major component of the endomysium. Collagen constitutes one to two percent of muscle tissue and accounts for 6% of the weight of the skeletal muscle tissue. The fibroblast is the most common cell that creates collagen. Gelatin, which is used in food and industry, is collagen that has been irreversibly hydrolyzed using heat, basic solutions or weak acids.

Etymology
The name collagen comes from the Greek κόλλα (kólla), meaning "glue", and suffix -γέν, -gen, denoting "producing".

Human types
Over 90% of the collagen in the human body is type I collagen. However, as of 2011, 28 types of human collagen have been identified, described, and divided into several groups according to the structure they form. All of the types contain at least one triple helix. The number of types shows collagen's diverse functionality.
 Fibrillar (Type I, II, III, V, XI)
 Non-fibrillar
 FACIT (Fibril Associated Collagens with Interrupted Triple Helices) (Type IX, XII, XIV, XIX, XXI)
 Short chain (Type VIII, X)
 Basement membrane (Type IV)
 Multiplexin (Multiple Triple Helix domains with Interruptions) (Type XV, XVIII)
 MACIT (Membrane Associated Collagens with Interrupted Triple Helices) (Type XIII, XVII)
 Microfibril forming (Type VI)
 Anchoring fibrils (Type VII)

The five most common types are:
 Type I: skin, tendon, vasculature, organs, bone (main component of the organic part of bone)
 Type II: cartilage (main collagenous component of cartilage)
 Type III: reticulate (main component of reticular fibers), commonly found alongside type I
 Type IV: forms basal lamina, the epithelium-secreted layer of the basement membrane
 Type V: cell surfaces, hair, and placenta

In human biology

Cardiac
The collagenous cardiac skeleton which includes the four heart valve rings, is histologically, elastically and uniquely bound to cardiac muscle. The cardiac skeleton also includes the separating septa of the heart chambers – the interventricular septum and the atrioventricular septum. Collagen contribution to the measure of cardiac performance summarily represents a continuous torsional force opposed to the fluid mechanics of blood pressure emitted from the heart. The collagenous structure that divides the upper chambers of the heart from the lower chambers is an impermeable membrane that excludes both blood and electrical impulses through typical physiological means. With support from collagen, atrial fibrillation never deteriorates to ventricular fibrillation. Collagen is layered in variable densities with smooth muscle mass. The mass, distribution, age and density of collagen all contribute to the compliance required to move blood back and forth. Individual cardiac valvular leaflets are folded into shape by specialized collagen under variable pressure. Gradual calcium deposition within collagen occurs as a natural function of aging. Calcified points within collagen matrices show contrast in a moving display of blood and muscle, enabling methods of cardiac imaging technology to arrive at ratios essentially stating blood in (cardiac input) and blood out (cardiac output). Pathology of the collagen underpinning of the heart is understood within the category of connective tissue disease.

Bone grafts
As the skeleton forms the structure of the body, it is vital that it maintains its strength, even after breaks and injuries. Collagen is used in bone grafting as it has a triple helical structure, making it a very strong molecule. It is ideal for use in bones, as it does not compromise the structural integrity of the skeleton. The triple helical structure of collagen prevents it from being broken down by enzymes, it enables adhesiveness of cells and it is important for the proper assembly of the extracellular matrix.

Tissue regeneration
Collagen scaffolds are used in tissue regeneration, whether in sponges, thin sheets, gels, or fibers. Collagen has favorable properties for tissue regeneration, such as pore structure, permeability, hydrophilicity, and stability in vivo. Collagen scaffolds also support deposition of cells, such as osteoblasts and fibroblasts, and once inserted, facilitate growth to proceed normally.

Reconstructive surgical uses
Collagens are widely employed in the construction of artificial skin substitutes used in the management of severe burns and wounds. These collagens may be derived from bovine, equine, porcine, or even human sources; and are sometimes used in combination with silicones, glycosaminoglycans, fibroblasts, growth factors and other substances.

Wound healing 

Collagen is one of the body's key natural resources and a component of skin tissue that can benefit all stages of wound healing. When collagen is made available to the wound bed, closure can occur. Wound deterioration, followed sometimes by procedures such as amputation, can thus be avoided.

Collagen is a natural product and is thus used as a natural wound dressing and has properties that artificial wound dressings do not have. It is resistant against bacteria, which is of vital importance in a wound dressing. It helps to keep the wound sterile, because of its natural ability to fight infection. When collagen is used as a burn dressing, healthy granulation tissue is able to form very quickly over the burn, helping it to heal rapidly.

Throughout the four phases of wound healing, collagen performs the following functions:
 Guiding function: Collagen fibers serve to guide fibroblasts. Fibroblasts migrate along a connective tissue matrix.
 Chemotactic properties: The large surface area available on collagen fibers can attract fibrogenic cells which help in healing.
 Nucleation: Collagen, in the presence of certain neutral salt molecules, can act as a nucleating agent causing formation of fibrillar structures.
 Hemostatic properties: Blood platelets interact with the collagen to make a hemostatic plug.

Basic research
Collagen is used in laboratory studies for cell culture, studying cell behavior and cellular interactions with the extracellular environment. Collagen is also widely used as a bioink for 3D bioprinting and biofabrication of 3D tissue models.

Biology
The collagen protein is composed of a triple helix, which generally consists of two identical chains (α1) and an additional chain that differs slightly in its chemical composition (α2). The amino acid composition of collagen is atypical for proteins, particularly with respect to its high hydroxyproline content. The most common motifs in the amino acid sequence of collagen are glycine-proline-X and glycine-X-hydroxyproline, where X is any amino acid other than glycine, proline or hydroxyproline. The average amino acid composition for fish and mammal skin is given.

Synthesis

First, a three-dimensional stranded structure is assembled, with the amino acids glycine and proline as its principal components. This is not yet collagen but its precursor, procollagen. Procollagen is then modified by the addition of hydroxyl groups to the amino acids proline and lysine. This step is important for later glycosylation and the formation of the triple helix structure of collagen. Because the hydroxylase enzymes that perform these reactions require vitamin C as a cofactor, a long-term deficiency in this vitamin results in impaired collagen synthesis and scurvy. These hydroxylation reactions are catalyzed by two different enzymes: prolyl-4-hydroxylase and lysyl-hydroxylase. The reaction consumes one ascorbate molecule per hydroxylation.

The synthesis of collagen occurs inside and outside of the cell. The formation of collagen which results in fibrillary collagen (most common form) is discussed here. Meshwork collagen, which is often involved in the formation of filtration systems, is the other form of collagen. All types of collagens are triple helices, and the differences lie in the make-up of the alpha peptides created in step 2.
 Transcription of mRNA: About 44 genes are associated with collagen formation, each coding for a specific mRNA sequence, and typically have the "COL" prefix. The beginning of collagen synthesis begins with turning on genes which are associated with the formation of a particular alpha peptide (typically alpha 1, 2 or 3).
 Pre-pro-peptide formation: Once the final mRNA exits from the cell nucleus and enters into the cytoplasm, it links with the ribosomal subunits and the process of translation occurs. The early/first part of the new peptide is known as the signal sequence. The signal sequence on the N-terminal of the peptide is recognized by a signal recognition particle on the endoplasmic reticulum, which will be responsible for directing the pre-pro-peptide into the endoplasmic reticulum. Therefore, once the synthesis of new peptide is finished, it goes directly into the endoplasmic reticulum for post-translational processing. It is now known as preprocollagen.
 Pre-pro-peptide to pro-collagen: Three modifications of the pre-pro-peptide occur leading to the formation of the alpha peptide:
 The signal peptide on the N-terminal is removed, and the molecule is now known as propeptide (not procollagen).
 Hydroxylation of lysines and prolines on propeptide by the enzymes 'prolyl hydroxylase' and 'lysyl hydroxylase' (to produce hydroxyproline and hydroxylysine) occurs to aid cross-linking of the alpha peptides. This enzymatic step requires vitamin C as a cofactor. In scurvy, the lack of hydroxylation of prolines and lysines causes a looser triple helix (which is formed by three alpha peptides).
 Glycosylation occurs by adding either glucose or galactose monomers onto the hydroxyl groups that were placed onto lysines, but not on prolines.
 Once these modifications have taken place, three of the hydroxylated and glycosylated propeptides twist into a triple helix forming procollagen. Procollagen still has unwound ends, which will be later trimmed. At this point, the procollagen is packaged into a transfer vesicle destined for the Golgi apparatus.
 Golgi apparatus modification: In the Golgi apparatus, the procollagen goes through one last post-translational modification before being secreted out of the cell. In this step, oligosaccharides (not monosaccharides as in step 3) are added, and then the procollagen is packaged into a secretory vesicle destined for the extracellular space.
 Formation of tropocollagen: Once outside the cell, membrane bound enzymes known as collagen peptidases, remove the "loose ends" of the procollagen molecule. What is left is known as tropocollagen. Defects in this step produce one of the many collagenopathies known as Ehlers–Danlos syndrome. This step is absent when synthesizing type III, a type of fibrillar collagen.
 Formation of the collagen fibril: lysyl oxidase, an extracellular copper-dependent enzyme, produces the final step in the collagen synthesis pathway. This enzyme acts on lysines and hydroxylysines producing aldehyde groups, which will eventually undergo covalent bonding between tropocollagen molecules. This polymer of tropocollagen is known as a collagen fibril.

Amino acids
Collagen has an unusual amino acid composition and sequence:
 Glycine is found at almost every third residue.
 Proline makes up about 17% of collagen.
 Collagen contains two uncommon derivative amino acids not directly inserted during translation. These amino acids are found at specific locations relative to glycine and are modified post-translationally by different enzymes, both of which require vitamin C as a cofactor.
 Hydroxyproline derived from proline
 Hydroxylysine derived from lysine – depending on the type of collagen, varying numbers of hydroxylysines are glycosylated (mostly having disaccharides attached).

Cortisol stimulates degradation of (skin) collagen into amino acids.

Collagen I formation 
Most collagen forms in a similar manner, but the following process is typical for type I:

 Inside the cell
 Two types of alpha chains – alpha-1 and alpha 2, are formed during translation on ribosomes along the rough endoplasmic reticulum (RER). These peptide chains known as preprocollagen, have registration peptides on each end and a signal peptide.
 Polypeptide chains are released into the lumen of the RER.
 Signal peptides are cleaved inside the RER and the chains are now known as pro-alpha chains.
 Hydroxylation of lysine and proline amino acids occurs inside the lumen. This process is dependent on and consumes ascorbic acid (vitamin C) as a cofactor.
 Glycosylation of specific hydroxylysine residues occurs.
 Triple alpha helical structure is formed inside the endoplasmic reticulum from two alpha-1 chains and one alpha-2 chain.
 Procollagen is shipped to the Golgi apparatus, where it is packaged and secreted into extracellular space by exocytosis.
 Outside the cell
 Registration peptides are cleaved and tropocollagen is formed by procollagen peptidase.
 Multiple tropocollagen molecules form collagen fibrils, via covalent cross-linking (aldol reaction) by lysyl oxidase which links hydroxylysine and lysine residues. Multiple collagen fibrils form into collagen fibers.
 Collagen may be attached to cell membranes via several types of protein, including fibronectin, laminin, fibulin and integrin.

Synthetic pathogenesis
Vitamin C deficiency causes scurvy, a serious and painful disease in which defective collagen prevents the formation of strong connective tissue. Gums deteriorate and bleed, with loss of teeth; skin discolors, and wounds do not heal. Prior to the 18th century, this condition was notorious among long-duration military, particularly naval, expeditions during which participants were deprived of foods containing vitamin C.

An autoimmune disease such as lupus erythematosus or rheumatoid arthritis may attack healthy collagen fibers.

Many bacteria and viruses secrete virulence factors, such as the enzyme collagenase, which destroys collagen or interferes with its production.

Molecular structure

A single collagen molecule, tropocollagen, is used to make up larger collagen aggregates, such as fibrils. It is approximately 300 nm long and 1.5 nm in diameter, and it is made up of three polypeptide strands (called alpha peptides, see step 2), each of which has the conformation of a left-handed helix – this should not be confused with the right-handed alpha helix. These three left-handed helices are twisted together into a right-handed triple helix or "super helix", a cooperative quaternary structure stabilized by many hydrogen bonds. With type I collagen and possibly all fibrillar collagens, if not all collagens, each triple-helix associates into a right-handed super-super-coil referred to as the collagen microfibril. Each microfibril is interdigitated with its neighboring microfibrils to a degree that might suggest they are individually unstable, although within collagen fibrils, they are so well ordered as to be crystalline.

A distinctive feature of collagen is the regular arrangement of amino acids in each of the three chains of these collagen subunits. The sequence often follows the pattern Gly-Pro-X or Gly-X-Hyp, where X may be any of various other amino acid residues. Proline or hydroxyproline constitute about 1/6 of the total sequence. With glycine accounting for the 1/3 of the sequence, this means approximately half of the collagen sequence is not glycine, proline or hydroxyproline, a fact often missed due to the distraction of the unusual GX1X2 character of collagen alpha-peptides. The high glycine content of collagen is important with respect to stabilization of the collagen helix as this allows the very close association of the collagen fibers within the molecule, facilitating hydrogen bonding and the formation of intermolecular cross-links. This kind of regular repetition and high glycine content is found in only a few other fibrous proteins, such as silk fibroin.

Collagen is not only a structural protein. Due to its key role in the determination of cell phenotype, cell adhesion, tissue regulation, and infrastructure, many sections of its non-proline-rich regions have cell or matrix association/regulation roles. The relatively high content of proline and hydroxyproline rings, with their geometrically constrained carboxyl and (secondary) amino groups, along with the rich abundance of glycine, accounts for the tendency of the individual polypeptide strands to form left-handed helices spontaneously, without any intrachain hydrogen bonding.

Because glycine is the smallest amino acid with no side chain, it plays a unique role in fibrous structural proteins. In collagen, Gly is required at every third position because the assembly of the triple helix puts this residue at the interior (axis) of the helix, where there is no space for a larger side group than glycine's single hydrogen atom. For the same reason, the rings of the Pro and Hyp must point outward. These two amino acids help stabilize the triple helix – Hyp even more so than Pro; a lower concentration of them is required in animals such as fish, whose body temperatures are lower than most warm-blooded animals. Lower proline and hydroxyproline contents are characteristic of cold-water, but not warm-water fish; the latter tend to have similar proline and hydroxyproline contents to mammals. The lower proline and hydroxproline contents of cold-water fish and other poikilotherm animals leads to their collagen having a lower thermal stability than mammalian collagen. This lower thermal stability means that gelatin derived from fish collagen is not suitable for many food and industrial applications.

The tropocollagen subunits spontaneously self-assemble, with regularly staggered ends, into even larger arrays in the extracellular spaces of tissues. Additional assembly of fibrils is guided by fibroblasts, which deposit fully formed fibrils from fibripositors. In the fibrillar collagens, molecules are staggered to adjacent molecules by about 67 nm (a unit that is referred to as ‘D’ and changes depending upon the hydration state of the aggregate). In each D-period repeat of the microfibril, there is a part containing five molecules in cross-section, called the "overlap", and a part containing only four molecules, called the "gap". These overlap and gap regions are retained as microfibrils assemble into fibrils, and are thus viewable using electron microscopy. The triple helical tropocollagens in the microfibrils are arranged in a quasihexagonal packing pattern.

There is some covalent crosslinking within the triple helices, and a variable amount of covalent crosslinking between tropocollagen helices forming well organized aggregates (such as fibrils). Larger fibrillar bundles are formed with the aid of several different classes of proteins (including different collagen types), glycoproteins, and proteoglycans to form the different types of mature tissues from alternate combinations of the same key players. Collagen's insolubility was a barrier to the study of monomeric collagen until it was found that tropocollagen from young animals can be extracted because it is not yet fully crosslinked. However, advances in microscopy techniques (i.e. electron microscopy (EM) and atomic force microscopy (AFM)) and X-ray diffraction have enabled researchers to obtain increasingly detailed images of collagen structure in situ. These later advances are particularly important to better understanding the way in which collagen structure affects cell–cell and cell–matrix communication and how tissues are constructed in growth and repair and changed in development and disease. For example, using AFM–based nanoindentation it has been shown that a single collagen fibril is a heterogeneous material along its axial direction with significantly different mechanical properties in its gap and overlap regions, correlating with its different molecular organizations in these two regions.

Collagen fibrils/aggregates are arranged in different combinations and concentrations in various tissues to provide varying tissue properties. In bone, entire collagen triple helices lie in a parallel, staggered array. 40 nm gaps between the ends of the tropocollagen subunits (approximately equal to the gap region) probably serve as nucleation sites for the deposition of long, hard, fine crystals of the mineral component, which is hydroxylapatite (approximately) Ca10(OH)2(PO4)6. Type I collagen gives bone its tensile strength.

Associated disorders

Collagen-related diseases most commonly arise from genetic defects or nutritional deficiencies that affect the biosynthesis, assembly, posttranslational modification, secretion, or other processes involved in normal collagen production.

In addition to the above-mentioned disorders, excessive deposition of collagen occurs in scleroderma.

Diseases
One thousand mutations have been identified in 12 out of more than 20 types of collagen. These mutations can lead to various diseases at the tissue level.

Osteogenesis imperfecta – Caused by a mutation in type 1 collagen, dominant autosomal disorder, results in weak bones and irregular connective tissue, some cases can be mild while others can be lethal. Mild cases have lowered levels of collagen type 1 while severe cases have structural defects in collagen.

Chondrodysplasias – Skeletal disorder believed to be caused by a mutation in type 2 collagen, further research is being conducted to confirm this.

Ehlers–Danlos syndrome – Thirteen different types of this disorder, which lead to deformities in connective tissue, are known. Some of the rarer types can be lethal, leading to the rupture of arteries. Each syndrome is caused by a different mutation. For example, the vascular type (vEDS) of this disorder is caused by a mutation in collagen type 3.

Alport syndrome – Can be passed on genetically, usually as X-linked dominant, but also as both an autosomal dominant and autosomal recessive disorder, sufferers have problems with their kidneys and eyes, loss of hearing can also develop during the childhood or adolescent years.

Knobloch syndrome – Caused by a mutation in the COL18A1 gene that codes for the production of collagen XVIII. Patients present with protrusion of the brain tissue and degeneration of the retina; an individual who has family members suffering from the disorder is at an increased risk of developing it themselves since there is a hereditary link.

Characteristics
Collagen is one of the long, fibrous structural proteins whose functions are quite different from those of globular proteins, such as enzymes. Tough bundles of collagen called collagen fibers are a major component of the extracellular matrix that supports most tissues and gives cells structure from the outside, but collagen is also found inside certain cells. Collagen has great tensile strength, and is the main component of fascia, cartilage, ligaments, tendons, bone and skin. Along with elastin and soft keratin, it is responsible for skin strength and elasticity, and its degradation leads to wrinkles that accompany aging. It strengthens blood vessels and plays a role in tissue development. It is present in the cornea and lens of the eye in crystalline form. It may be one of the most abundant proteins in the fossil record, given that it appears to fossilize frequently, even in bones from the Mesozoic and Paleozoic.

Uses

Collagen has a wide variety of applications, from food to medical. In the medical industry it is used in cosmetic surgery and burn surgery. In the food sector, one usage example is in casings for sausages.

If collagen is subject to sufficient denaturation, e.g. by heating, the three tropocollagen strands separate partially or completely into globular domains, containing a different secondary structure to the normal collagen polyproline II (PPII), e.g. random coils. This process describes the formation of gelatin, which is used in many foods, including flavored gelatin desserts. Besides food, gelatin has been used in pharmaceutical, cosmetic, and photography industries. It is also used as a dietary supplement.

From the Greek for glue, kolla, the word collagen means "glue producer" and refers to the early process of boiling the skin and sinews of horses and other animals to obtain glue. Collagen adhesive was used by Egyptians about 4,000 years ago, and Native Americans used it in bows about 1,500 years ago. The oldest glue in the world, carbon-dated as more than 8,000 years old, was found to be collagen – used as a protective lining on rope baskets and embroidered fabrics, to hold utensils together, and in crisscross decorations on human skulls. Collagen normally converts to gelatin, but survived due to dry conditions. Animal glues are thermoplastic, softening again upon reheating, so they are still used in making musical instruments such as fine violins and guitars, which may have to be reopened for repairs – an application incompatible with tough, synthetic plastic adhesives, which are permanent. Animal sinews and skins, including leather, have been used to make useful articles for millennia.

Gelatin-resorcinol-formaldehyde glue (and with formaldehyde replaced by less-toxic pentanedial and ethanedial) has been used to repair experimental incisions in rabbit lungs.

Cosmetics 

Bovine collagen is widely used in dermal fillers for aesthetic correction of wrinkles and skin aging. Collagen cremes are also widely sold even though collagen cannot penetrate the skin because its fibers are too large. Most research on collagen supplements has been funded by industries that could benefit from a positive study result.

History
The molecular and packing structures of collagen eluded scientists over decades of research. The first evidence that it possesses a regular structure at the molecular level was presented in the mid-1930s. Research then concentrated on the conformation of the collagen monomer, producing several competing models, although correctly dealing with the conformation of each individual peptide chain. The triple-helical "Madras" model, proposed by G. N. Ramachandran in 1955, provided an accurate model of quaternary structure in collagen. This model was supported by further studies of higher resolution in the late 20th century.

The packing structure of collagen has not been defined to the same degree outside of the fibrillar collagen types, although it has been long known to be hexagonal. As with its monomeric structure, several conflicting models propose either that the packing arrangement of collagen molecules is 'sheet-like', or is microfibrillar. The microfibrillar structure of collagen fibrils in tendon, cornea and cartilage was imaged directly by electron microscopy in the late 20th century and early 21st century. The microfibrillar structure of rat tail tendon was modeled as being closest to the observed structure, although it oversimplified the topological progression of neighboring collagen molecules, and so did not predict the correct conformation of the discontinuous D-periodic pentameric arrangement termed microfibril.

See also

 Collagen hybridizing peptide, a peptide that can bind to denatured collagen
 Hypermobility spectrum disorder
 Metalloprotease inhibitor
 Osteoid, collagen-containing component of bone

References

Structural proteins
Edible thickening agents
Aging-related proteins